Events from the year 1993 in Sweden

Incumbents
 Monarch – Carl XVI Gustaf
 Prime Minister – Carl Bildt

Events

January
 1 January – The Sami Parliament of Sweden established.

Undated
Svea Fireworks company is founded.

Popular culture

Literature
 Händelser vid vatten, novel by Kerstin Ekman, winner of the August Prize.

Sports 
 The 1993 Allsvenskan was won by IFK Göteborg

Births

28 March – Adam Lindgren, gamer
17 August – Sarah Sjöström  swimmer
23 September – Pontus Åberg ice hockey player
 31 October – Michelle Coleman, swimmer
 22 November – Mattias Rönngren, alpine ski racer.

Deaths
 1 February – Sven Thofelt, modern pentathlete, Olympic champion 1928 (born 1904).

See also
 1993 in Swedish television

References

 
Years of the 20th century in Sweden
Sweden
1990s in Sweden
Sweden